In category theory, a branch of mathematics, a groupoid object is both a generalization of a groupoid which is built on richer structures than sets, and a generalization of a group objects when the multiplication is only partially defined.

Definition 
A groupoid object in a category C admitting finite fiber products consists of a pair of objects  together with five morphisms

satisfying the following groupoid axioms
 (associativity) 
 (unit) 

Examples

Group objects 
One recovers therefore topological groups by taking the category of topological spaces, or Lie groups by taking the category of manifolds, etc.

Groupoids 
A groupoid object in the category of sets is precisely a groupoid in the usual sense: a category in which every morphism is an isomorphism. When the term "groupoid" can naturally refer to a groupoid object in some particular category in mind, the term groupoid set is used to refer to a groupoid object in the category of sets.

However, unlike in the previous example with Lie groups, a groupoid object in the category of manifolds is not necessarily a Lie groupoid, since the maps s and t fail to satisfy further requirements (they are not necessarily submersions).

Groupoid schemes 
A groupoid S-scheme is a groupoid object in the category of schemes over some fixed base scheme S. If , then a groupoid scheme (where  are necessarily the structure map) is the same as a group scheme.

For example, suppose an algebraic group G acts from the right on a scheme U. Then take , s the projection, t the given action. This determines a groupoid scheme.

Constructions 
The coequalizer of the same diagram, if any, is the quotient of the groupoid.

Each groupoid object in a category C (if any) may be thought of as a contravariant functor from C to the category of groupoids. This way, each groupoid object determines a prestack in groupoids. This prestack is not a stack but it can be stackified to yield a stack.

The main use of the notion is that it provides an atlas for a stack. More specifically, let  be the category of -torsors. Then it is a category fibered in groupoids; in fact, (in a nice case), a Deligne–Mumford stack. Conversely, any DM stack is of this form.

See also 
Simplicial scheme

Notes

References 

H. Gillet, Intersection theory on algebraic stacks and Q-varieties, J. Pure Appl. Algebra 34 (1984), 193–240, Proceedings of the Luminy conference on algebraic K-theory (Luminy, 1983).

Algebraic geometry
Scheme theory
Category theory